Needmore is an unincorporated community in Echols County, in the U.S. state of Georgia.

History
According to tradition, the community was so named because its country store "needed more" of everything.

References

Unincorporated communities in Echols County, Georgia